On My Own may refer to:

Albums
 On My Own (Brandon Paris Band album) or the title song, 2006
 On My Own (Jonalyn Viray album), 2005
 On My Own (Magic album), 2003
 On My Own (Queensberry album) or the title song, 2009
 On My Own (Tatiana Okupnik album) or the title song, 2007
 On My Own, by Crunchy Black, 2006
 On My Own, by Trans-X, 1988

Songs
 "On My Own" (Bishara song), at Melodifestivalen 2019
 "On My Own" (Haldor Lægreid song), representing Norway at Eurovision 2001
 "On My Own" (Hedley song), 2005
 "On My Own" (Les Misérables), from the musical Les Misérables, 1980
 "On My Own" (Patti LaBelle and Michael McDonald song), 1986; covered by Reba McEntire, 1995
 "On My Own" (Peach Union song), 1996
 "On My Own" (Yasmin song), 2011
 "On My Own", by Ashes Remain from What I've Become, 2011
 "On My Own", by Beddy Rays, 2021
 "On My Own", by Claire Richards from My Wildest Dreams, 2019
 "On My Own", by Farrah Abraham from My Teenage Dream Ended, 2012
 "On My Own", by Hank Williams III from Risin' Outlaw, 1999
 "On My Own", by Jaden from Erys, 2019
 "On My Own", by Marina Kaye, 2017
 "On My Own", by Miley Cyrus from Bangerz, 2013
 "On My Own", by Mumzy Stranger, 2008
 "On My Own", by Niall Horan from Flicker, 2017
 "On My Own", by Tee Grizzley from Activated, 2018
 "On My Own", by Three Days Grace from One-X, 2006
 "On My Own", by the Used from The Used, 2002

Other uses
 On My Own (film), a 1991 film starring Judy Davis and Matthew Ferguson
 On My Own (memoir), a 1958 memoir by Eleanor Roosevelt
 On My Own, a novel by Melody Carlson

See also
 On Our Own (disambiguation)
 On Your Own (disambiguation)